The 1931 World Archery Championships was the inaugural edition of the event. It was held in Lwów, Poland in August 1931.

Following the competition, on 4 September, the World Archery Federation (FITA) was formally founded by the four nations which sent representatives to the Championships (Sweden, Czechoslovakia, France, Poland) along with representatives of the United States, Hungary, and Italy.

Medals summary

Medals table

Results

Individual
Competitors shot arrows from three distances, 30 meters, 40 meters, and 50 meters, at a round static ringed target. The scores in each round were aggregated, and competitors ranked by total score.

Team
An unofficial team competition was also held. Three teams of three archers each entered, two representing Poland and a third team from France, who won the tournament.

References

External links
 World Archery website
 Complete results

World Championship
World Archery
World Archery Championships
Sport in Lviv
International archery competitions hosted by Poland